Muhammad Farid Abu Hadid (1 July 1893 – 18 May 1967) was an Egyptian writer, poet and historian. He was the editor-in-chief of the magazine . He helped Ahmad Hasan al-Zayyat establish the magazine Arrissalah.

References

External links
 Egyptian Figures: Muhammad Farid Abu Hadid

1893 births
1967 deaths
Egyptian male poets
20th-century Egyptian historians
20th-century Egyptian poets
20th-century male writers
Egyptian children's writers